Château de l'Hospital is a Bordeaux winery in the Graves AOC. It is a 12-acre domaine. The red wine is made of cabernet franc, cabernet sauvignon, and a small amount of malbec. Madame de Lacaussade took over as winemaker in 1964 following her husband's accidental fall in a vinifying vat and later death, as her sons were not keen to become winemakers.

References

External links

French wine